Nirmalya Kumar (born 8 March 1960) is Professor of Marketing of the Lee Kong Chian School of Business at Singapore Management University. He has served on the Boards of ACC Limited, Ambuja Cements, Bata India, BP Ergo, Defaqto, Tata Capital, Tata Chemicals, Tata Industries, Tata Limited (UK), Tata Unistore, Ultratech, and Zensar Technologies. He received the 2021 Mahajan Award for Lifetime Contributions to Marketing Strategy by the Marketing Strategy SIG of the American Marketing Association (AMA).

Biography

Education

Kumar was educated at La Martiniere Calcutta school, and received his Bachelor of Commerce degree from Calcutta University in 1980, and his Master of Commerce degree from Shivaji University in 1983. In 1986, he completed his MBA at the University of Illinois at Chicago and in 1991, received his Ph.D in Marketing at the Kellogg School of Management in Northwestern University.

Career

From 1991 to 1994, he was assistant professor of marketing at The Pennsylvania State University. From 1995 to 2003, he was professor of marketing at International Institute for Management Development. From 2003 to 2013, he was professor of marketing at London Business School. From 2013 to 2016, he was a member-group executive council and head of strategy at the Tata Group. From 2017 to now, he is the Lee Kong Chian professor of marketing at Singapore Management University and a Distinguished Fellow at INSEAD Emerging Markets Institute.

He has authored nine books, besides ten appearances in Harvard Business Review, on marketing and business-related topics. Other publications have appeared in Academy of Management Journal, Journal of Marketing, and Journal of Marketing Research. These publications have over 22,000 Google Scholar citations. He is notable for proposing the culture of "3Vs": valued customer, value proposition and value network, explained in his book Marketing as Strategy: Understanding the CEO's Agenda for Driving Growth and Innovation.

He has appeared on the lists of Thinkers50, World's Best B-School Professors, 50 Most Influential Business School Professors.

In 2011, he received the Global Village Award by Thinkers50 for the person who contributed most to the business community's understanding of globalization and the new frontiers established by emerging markets. In 2017, he was inducted into the Thinkers50 Hall of Fame for making a lasting and vital impact on how organisations are led and managed.

Being a prolific case writer, following six Case Centre awards for best selling cases, in 2014, Kumar received their prestigious 'Outstanding Contribution to the Case Method' Award.
Kumar has also featured among the top 40 case authors consistently, since the list was first published in 2016 by The Case Centre. He ranked 23rd  In 2018/19, 33rd in 2017/18, 34th in 2016/17 and 27th in 2015/16.

Prof Kumar was awarded the 2021 Mahajan Award for Lifetime Contributions to Marketing Strategy Research by the American Marketing Association (AMA), a professional association for marketing professionals with 30,000 members.

Art Collector 

Nirmalya Kumar is an ardent supporter and patron of the Arts. He owns the largest collection of Jamini Roy Paintings outside of India 

and is considered a specialist on the Bengal  School of Art rebel artists, especially Jamini Roy, Hemen Mazumder and Rabindranath Tagore. Jamini Roy among them is considered to be father of Modern Indian Art.
He is Passionate about art, he supports exhibitions and publications through his Indian art collection. In 2013, he was recognized for his efforts on behalf of South Asian art with an Honorary Fellowship by SOAS University of London.

Books

References

External links 
 https://www.smu.edu.sg/faculty/profile/149166/Nirmalya-KUMAR
 Interview with Rediff.com

1960 births
University of Calcutta alumni
Living people
University of Illinois Chicago alumni
Shivaji University alumni
Business educators
Bestselling case authors